Butenolides are a class of lactones with a four-carbon heterocyclic ring structure.  They are sometimes considered oxidized derivatives of furan. The simplest butenolide is 2-furanone, which is a common component of larger natural products and is sometimes referred to as simply "butenolide".  A common biochemically important butenolide is ascorbic acid (vitamin C). Butenolide derivatives known as karrikins are produced by some plants on exposure to high temperatures due to brush fires. In particular, 3-methyl-2H-furo[2,3-c]pyran-2-one was found to trigger seed germination in plants whose reproduction is fire-dependent.

References

External links 
 Synthesis of butenolides

Furanones